Xenodonta is a genus of sea snails, deep-sea limpets, marine gastropod mollusks in the family Bathysciadiidae.

Species
Species within the genus Xenodonta include:

 Xenodonta bogasoni Warén, 1993

Distribution
European waters

References

External links

Bathysciadiidae
Monotypic gastropod genera